Definitely La Yi Yi Yi, also known as Definitivamente La Yi Yi Yi is an album by La Lupe. It was released by Tico Records in 1969. AllMusic gave the album a rating of four stars.

Track listing
Side A
 "Fijense" (C. Curet Alonso) [2:26]
 "Miedo" (R. de Leon) [2:35]
 "Silencio" (Rasso, Brezza, Ballay, Cadalso) [3:14]
 "Quisqueya" (Rafael Hernandez) [2:21]
 "Avanaza y Vete de Aqui" (C. Curet Alonso) [2:10]

Side B
 "Toitica Tuya" (J. Vazquez) [2:15]
 "A Borinquen" (R. Velez) [2:12]
 "Si Tu No Vienes" (Lupe Yoli) [3:12]
 "La Virgen Lloraba" (Lupe Yoli) [2:07]
 "Saraycoco" (Lupe Yoli) [3:00]

References

1969 albums
Tico Records albums